Stephanie Adrienne McKeon (born 9 June 1987) is an Irish actress. She began her career as a teenager in the RTÉ soap opera Fair City (2004–2007). She was nominated for Laurence Olivier and WhatsOnStage Awards for her role as Anna in the West End production of Frozen.

Early life
McKeon grew up in a theatre family in Dublin. She attended Belgrove Girls' School in Clontarf, where she discovered acting through a school production of Bugsy Malone when she was seven. She took drama classes at the First Active Children's Theatre (FACT). She studied Drama and Theatre at Trinity College Dublin, graduating in 2009.

Career
When she was a teenager, McKeon played Aisling O'Brien in the RTÉ soap opera Fair City from 2004 to 2007.

After graduating from Trinity, McKeon went into theatre. She starred as Dorothy in Sean Gilligan's The Wizard of Oz. In 2012, she played Cinderella in the Gaiety Theatre's Christmas pantomime as well as Philomena O'Shea in the Improbable Frequency revival. She also appeared in The Life and Sort of Death of Eric Argyle at the Pleasance Dome in Edinburgh and Anglo: The Musical at the Olympia Theatre.

McKeon then relocated to London when she was cast as Natalie in The Commitments at the Palace Theatre, originating the role and marking her West End debut in 2013. She was then a lead vocalist in Kyle Riabko's Bacharach Reimagined shows in 2015; What's It All About? was put on at the Menier Chocolate Factory. It was reimagined as Close to You when it moved to the Criterion Theatre. She took over the role of Cynthia Weil in Beautiful: The Carole King Musical for its final ten weeks at the Aldwych Theatre in 2017.

In 2019, McKeon was cast as Princess Anna opposite Samantha Barks as Elsa in the West End run of the stage adaptation of Disney's Frozen. After being delayed due to the COVID-19 pandemic, the show opened in 2021 at the Theatre Royal, Drury Lane. For her performance, McKeon was nominated for both the WhatsOnStage Award and the Laurence Olivier Award for Best Actress in a Musical. McKeon released an EP Here I Go (2021) consisting of musical theatre covers.

Personal life
McKeon married Kyle Riabko in December 2017, having met through Bacharach Reimagined. In February 2023, the couple announced they were expecting their first child.

Filmography

Stage

Awards and nominations

References

External links
 
 Stephanie McKeon at Spotlight

1987 births
Living people
Alumni of Trinity College Dublin
Irish expatriates in England
Irish musical theatre actresses
Irish soap opera actresses
Irish sopranos
Irish television actresses
Irish video game actresses
Irish voice actresses
21st-century Irish actresses